Dubbel is a 2008 studio album by Lena Philipsson & Orup and part of their cooperation-project Lena + Orup. They have written the songs alone.

The songs "Nu när du gått" and "Fem minuter i himmelen" charted at Svensktoppen, where they both stayed for three weeks, "Nu när du gått" between 26 October-9 November 2008 and "Fem minuter i himmelen" between 15 -29 March 2009.

In 2010, the song  "Fem minuter i himmelen" was recorded by Torgny Melins and Melissa Williams on the album Dansbandsnatt.

Track listing
"Hals över huvud" – 3:38
"Nu när du gått" – 3:35
"Fotbollsstjärna" – 2:47
"Jag hatar att vakna utan dej" – 3:35
"1 skäl" – 4:07
"Fem minuter i himmelen" – 3:22
"Bara en polis" – 3:45
"Jag måste skynda mig på" – 4:00
"Så mycket bättre än dom andra" – 3:59
"Blott en skugga" – 2:39

Contributors
Lena Philipsson — vocals
Orup — vocals, piano, keyboards, bass, guitar
Peter Månsson — keyboards, piano, organ, guitar, bass, programming, drums, percussion
Joakim Hemming — bass, guitar
Petter Bergander — piano, organ

Charts

References 

2008 albums
Lena Philipsson albums
Orup albums